The Harpers Ferry class of the United States Navy is a class of dock landing ships completed in the early 1990s. Externally, the two classes can be distinguished by the positions of weapons: The Harpers Ferry class has the Phalanx CIWS mounted forward, and the RAM launcher on top of the bridge, while the Whidbey Island has the opposite arrangement.

As of 2009, all ships of the class are scheduled to undergo a midlife upgrade to ensure they remain in service through 2038. The ships will be upgraded each year through 2013, and the last ship will be modernized in 2014. Ships homeported on the East Coast will undergo upgrades at Metro Machine Corp., and ships based on the West Coast will receive upgrades at General Dynamics National Steel and Shipbuilding Company in San Diego.

Major elements of the upgrade package include diesel engine improvements, fuel and maintenance savings systems, engineering control systems, increased air conditioning/chill water capacity, and replacement of air compressors. The ships also replaced steam systems with all-electric functionality that will decrease maintenance.

Harpers Ferry–class ships

Sources

US Navy Type Information 
Hutchinson, R. (2002) Jane's Warship Recognition Guide Harper Collins: London, New York.

Amphibious warfare vessel classes
Naval ships of the United States